Abdul-Malik Badruldeen al-Houthi is a Yemeni politician and religious leader who serves as the leader of the Houthi movement, a revolutionary movement principally made up of Zaidi Muslims. His brothers Yahia and Abdul-Karim are also leaders of the group, as were his late brothers Hussein, Ibrahim, and Abdulkhaliq. Abdul-Malik Houthi is the leading figure in the Yemeni Civil War which started with the Houthi takeover in Yemen in the Saada Governorate in northern Yemen.

Personal life
Al-Houthi was born in Saada, northern Yemen, into the Houthi tribe in 1982. Some sources state that he was born on 22 May 1979. He follows the Zaidiyyah branch of Shia Islam. His father, Badreddin, was a religious scholar of Yemen's minority Zaydi Shia sect. Abdul-Malik was the youngest among his eight brothers. His older brother, Hussein, was politically active and a member of the parliament of Yemen, as well as being a prominent critic of the former President of Yemen, Ali Abdullah Saleh. Hussein founded the Houthi movement to promote Zaidi thought, rise against the oppressors ruling Yemen, and to provide educational and social services. After Hussein was killed, Abdul-Malik succeeded him by taking control of the movement.

Political activity

Abdul-Malik al-Houthi criticized the Yemeni government for maintaining a status quo in the country, which he said had plunged people into poverty, and accused the government of marginalizing the Zaidi community. The Yemeni government of president Ali Abdullah Saleh accused al-Houthi's group of trying to reestablish the "clerical imamate" (Shia Islamic government), which al-Houthi denied.

Al-Houthi was reported to have been badly injured during an air raid in December 2009, a claim denied by a spokesman. On 26 December 2009, two days after a heavy air strike from the Royal Saudi Air Force, it was claimed that Al-Houthi had been killed. However, the claim was refuted by the Houthis, who then released video evidence showing he was alive.

Al-Houthi addressed the nation on Yemen TV in a late-night speech on 20 January 2015, after troops loyal to him seized the presidential palace and attacked the private residence of president Abd Rabbuh Mansur Hadi in Sana'a. He demanded Hadi implement reforms giving the Houthi movement more control over the government. Although it was initially reported that Hadi conceded to al-Houthi's demands, the president resigned from office on 22 January, saying the political process had "reached a dead end". The UN Security Council then imposed sanctions on al-Houthi. He was praised by Iranian conservative politician Mohsen Rezaei, in a statement of moral support and defense of "real Islamic awakening".

During the bombing of the Sanaa airport by Saudi-led coalition warplanes in 2015, missiles pounded al-Houthi's hometown of Marran.

According to the Guardian News agency, more than 40 Saudi officers have been trained at prestigious British military colleges since the Saudi intervention in Yemen started. This officers mostly trained at Sandhurst, the RAF’s school at Cranwell and the Royal Naval College in Dartmouth since 2015. The MoD refused to state the earned money from the Saudi contracts, because it could influence Britain's relations with the Saudis.

al-Houthi condemned the UK military cooperation and arms sales to Saudi military. According to a Sky News analysis, The UK has sold at least £5.7bn worth of arms to the Saudi-led coalition fighting in Yemen since 2015.

On 10 May 2020, al-Houthi criticized the show Um Harun for promoting normalization of ties with Israel.

International reaction
The UN announced a travel ban on al-Houthi in November 2014 after the Houthi takeover of Sana'a. On 27 April 2015, the US Treasury Department added Abdul-Malik to its Specially Designated Nationals (SDN) list.

During a visit to the northern province, Jamal Benomar, the former UN envoy to Yemen, met with al-Houthi and said he supported the Houthi group in their rejection of moving the talks between Al Houthi and the current government outside of Yemen, in spite of the complaint of Hadi, the Yemeni legitimate president.

On 10 January 2021, U.S. Secretary of State Mike Pompeo announced plans to designate Abdul Malik al-Houthi, Abd al-Khaliq Badr al-Din al-Houthi and Abdullah Yahya al Hakim as Specially Designated Global Terrorists. A month later, Antony J. Blinken revoked the designation of the trio as Specially Designated Global Terrorists.

References

External links
 Video of al-Houthi addressing his supporters

Living people
1979 births
21st-century Yemeni politicians
Houthi members
People from Saada Governorate
People of the Yemeni Civil War (2014–present)
Yemeni Zaydis
Houthi family
Specially Designated Nationals and Blocked Persons List
Leaders who took power by coup